Cold Ash Hill is a hamlet in the East Hampshire district of Hampshire, England. Nearby settlements include the town of Haslemere and the villages of Liphook, Bramshott and Linchmere and the hamlet of Hammer. For transport there is the A3 road and Liphook railway station nearby.

Hamlets in Hampshire